Othman Al Hamour (Arabic:عثمان الهامور) (born 22 March 1992) is an Emirati footballer. He currently plays for Al-Hamriyah as a right back .

Career
Al-Hamour started his career at Al-Sharjah and is a product of the Al-Sharjah's youth system, he moved to the Al-Wahda's youth . On 29 September 2012, Al-Hamour made his professional debut for Al-Wahda against Al-Shabab in the Pro League . On 22 September 2013, left Al-Wahda and signed with Al-Wasl. On 22 November 2013, Al-Hamour made his professional debut for Al-Wasl against Al-Shabab in the Pro League . On Season 2016, signed with Al-Hamriyah.

References

External links
 

1992 births
Living people
Emirati footballers
Sharjah FC players
Al Wahda FC players
Al-Wasl F.C. players
Al Hamriyah Club players
UAE Pro League players
UAE First Division League players
Association football fullbacks
Place of birth missing (living people)